Rothmans may refer to:
 Rothmans, Benson & Hedges, a Canadian tobacco company
 Rothmans International, a former British tobacco manufacturer, founded by Louis Rothman

See also
 Rothman, a surname
 Rothmans 12 hours, a series of sports car races in Gold Coast, Australia 
 Rothmans 50,000, a 1972 motor race held at Brands Hatch, England
 Rothmans 100,000, a horse race in Brisbane, Australia
 Rothmans Canadian Open or Canada Masters, a tennis tournament
 Rothmans European F5000 Championship, an auto-racing formula 
 Rothmans Football Yearbook, now The Football Yearbook, an annual reference work
 Rothmans Grand Prix, now World Open, a snooker tournament
 Rothmans International Series, an Australian motor racing competition
 Rothmans International Tennis Tournament, a men's tennis tournament in London
 Rothmans Malaysian Masters, a golf tournament
 Rothmans Medal, an award in Australian Rugby League
 Rothmans Porsche, a motor racing team
 Rothmans Sun-7 Series, a touring car racing series in Sydney, Australian